Annabel Elizabeth Fisher (born 19 September 1989) is a British professional racing cyclist, who currently rides for UCI Women's Continental Team . In October 2020, she rode in the women's edition of the 2020 Liège–Bastogne–Liège race in Belgium.

References

External links
 

1989 births
Living people
British female cyclists
Sportspeople from Leeds